is a member of the House of Representatives of Japan as well as a visiting professor at Chuo University's Graduate School of Public Studies. He served as the Parliamentary Vice Minister of Defense in the Kan Cabinet.

From 1993 to 1995, he was a visiting scholar at Vanderbilt University, Nashville, Tennessee, before becoming a research associate in Asian Security Studies in 1997, and an Adjunct Senior Fellow in Asia Studies at the Council on Foreign Relations, Washington, D.C., in 1999. From 2000 to 2001, he was a visiting scholar at the Edwin O. Reischauer Center for East Asian Studies at the Johns Hopkins University School of Advanced International Studies (SAIS), Washington, D.C. After coming back to Japan, he taught as a lecturer at Keio University's Graduate School of Law from 2003 to 2007.

Nagashima received his B.A. in Law in 1984, his B.A. in Government in 1986, and his Master of Laws (LL.M) from Keio University in 1988. He received his M.A. from Johns Hopkins SAIS in 1997. He was born on February 17, 1962, in Yokohama-City, Kanagawa Prefecture, Japan.

Political career 
He started his political career with the Democratic Party of Japan (DPJ). During his time as an opposition legislator at the National Diet of Japan, he has served as the Senior Director of the Committee on National Security, Director of the Committee on Foreign Affairs, Special Committee on North Korean Abductions and Other Issues, as well as a member of the Committee on Education, Sports, Science and Technology, the Special Committee on Iraq and Terrorism and the Special Committee on Responses of Armed Attacks. From 2003 to 2004, he served as the Deputy Director-General of the Cultural and Organizations Department of the DPJ, as well as the Next Vice-Minister of Defense before becoming the Next Minister of Defense from 2005 to 2006. Later he has served as the Vice-Chair of the Diet Affairs Committee, the Policy Research Committee, and Deputy Secretary General of the DPJ. He left the DP in April 2017 due to a disagreement with the party's cooperation with the JCP. Prior to the 2017 general election, he participated in the foundation of the Party of Hope. When Hope merged with the Democratic Party in May 2018 to form the Democratic Party for the People, Nagashima decided not to join the new party and became an independent member instead. In June 2019 he joined the LDP.

Formerly affiliated to the openly revisionist lobby Nippon Kaigi, Nagashima contributed, with Yoshiko Sakurai, Eriko Sanya, and Masahiro Akiyama, to a forum on the Constitution about security, independence, and the article 9 in their journal in July 2009. In September 2015, Nagashima announced his withdrawal from Nippon Kaigi.

References 

1962 births
Living people
People from Yokohama
Keio University alumni
Members of Nippon Kaigi
Johns Hopkins University alumni
Members of the House of Representatives (Japan)
Democratic Party of Japan politicians
21st-century Japanese politicians